Jennifer Day Morrison (born August 22, 1979) is an American country music singer. Signed to BNA Records in late 1999, she has released one studio album (2000's The Fun of Your Love) and has charted two singles on the Billboard Hot Country Singles & Tracks (now Hot Country Songs) charts. The album's title track was also featured in the 2000 film For Love of the Game.

Discography

Albums

Singles

Music videos

References

External links
Jennifer Morrison on Myspace

1979 births
American women country singers
American country singer-songwriters
Singer-songwriters from Florida
Living people
BNA Records artists
People from Suwannee County, Florida
21st-century American singers
21st-century American women singers
Country musicians from Florida